In the mathematical discipline of graph theory, the Erdős–Pósa theorem, named after Paul Erdős and Lajos Pósa, relates two parameters of a graph:

 The size of the largest collection of vertex-disjoint cycles contained in the graph;
 The size of the smallest feedback vertex set in the graph: a set that contains one vertex from every cycle.

Motivation and statement

In many applications, we are interested in finding a minimum feedback vertex set in a graph: a small set that includes one vertex from every cycle, or, equivalently, a small set of vertices whose removal destroys all cycles. This is a hard computational problem; if we are not able to solve it exactly, we can instead try to find lower and upper bounds on the size of the minimum feedback vertex set. 

One approach to find lower bounds is to find a collection of vertex-disjoint cycles in a graph. For example, consider the graph in Figure 1. The cycles A-B-C-F-A and G-H-I-J-G share no vertices. As a result, if we want to remove vertices and destroy all cycles in the graph, we must remove at least two vertices: one from the first cycle and one from the second. This line of reasoning generalizes: if we can find  vertex-disjoint cycles in a graph, then every feedback vertex set in the graph must have at least  vertices.

Unfortunately, in general, this bound is not tight: if the largest collection of vertex-disjoint cycles in a graph contains  cycles, then it does not necessarily follow that there is a feedback vertex set of size . The graph in Figure 1 is an example of this: even if we destroy cycle G-H-I-J-G by removing one of the vertices G, H, I, or J, we cannot destroy all four of the cycles A-B-C-F-A, A-B-E-F-A, B-C-D-E-B, and C-D-E-F-C by removing only one more vertex. Any minimum feedback vertex set in the graph in Figure 1 has three vertices: for example, the three vertices A, C, and G. 

It is possible to construct examples in which the gap between the two quantities - the size of the largest collection of vertex-disjoint cycles, and the size of the smallest feedback vertex set - is arbitrarily large. The Erdős–Pósa theorem says that despite this, knowing one quantity does put lower and upper bounds on the other quantity. Formally, the theorem states that there exists a function  such that for each positive integer , every graph either

 contains a collection of  vertex-disjoint cycles, or
 has a feedback vertex set of at most  vertices.

For example, suppose we have determined that for the graph in Figure 1, there is a collection of 2 vertex-disjoint cycles, but no collection of 3 vertex-disjoint cycles. Our earlier argument says that the smallest feedback vertex set must have at least 2 vertices; the Erdős–Pósa theorem says that the smallest feedback vertex set must have at most  vertices.

In principle, many functions  could satisfy the theorem.

Bounds on the Erdős–Pósa function

In Big O notation, .

A previous unpublished result of Béla Bollobás stated : in simpler terms, any graph which does not contain two vertex-disjoint cycles has a feedback vertex set of at most three vertices. Here, because any cycle must contain at least three vertices, and there are only 5 vertices total, any two cycles must overlap in at least one vertex. On the other hand, a set of only two vertices cannot be a feedback vertex set because the other three vertices will form a cycle: a feedback vertex set must contain at least three vertices.

Erdős–Pósa property
A family  of graphs or hypergraphs is defined to have the Erdős–Pósa property if there exists a function  such that for every (hyper-)graph  and every integer  one of the following is true:

The definition is often phrased as follows.

Rephrased in this terminology, the Erdős–Pósa theorem states that the family  consisting of all cycles has the Erdős–Pósa property, with bounding function . Robertson and Seymour (1986) generalized this considerably. Given a graph , let denote the family of all graphs that contain  as a minor. As a corollary of their grid minor theorem, Robertson and Seymour proved that has the Erdős–Pósa property if and only if  is a planar graph. Moreover, it is now known that the corresponding bounding function is   if  is a forest , while  for every other planar graph  . 

Thus, the special case where   is a triangle is equivalent to the Erdős–Pósa theorem.

References

See also 

 Pósa theorem (1962).
 A list of graph classes for which the Erdös-Pósa property is known to (not) hold.

Theorems in graph theory